Head of femur can refer to:

 Femoral head
 Head of Femur (band)